Goh Raalhu is a 2019 Maldivian crime thriller film directed by Ahmed Sinan. Produced by Mohamed Ali and Aishath Fuad Thaufeeq under Dark Rain Entertainment, the film stars Mohamed Jumayyil, Hassan Irufan, Aishath Thasneema and Aminath Rashfa in pivotal roles. The film was released on 4 February 2019.

Premise
Aiman (Mohamed Jumayyil) develops inexplicable feelings for Zaina (Aishath Thasneema) who was dating notorious gangster, Husham (Hassan Irfan). Aiman tries to warn Zaina about the shady affairs of Husham who flaunts his devious deed whenever he gets the chance. Being helplessly in love, Zaina refuses to believe Aiman. Feeling threatened, Husham decides to teach Aiman a lesson, that pulls him into the dark, murky life of the city's most ruthless, ill-reputed hoodlum.

Cast 
 Mohamed Jumayyil as Aiman
 Hassan Irufan as Husham
 Aishath Thasneema as Zaina
 Aminath Rashfa as Niusha
 Abdullah Azaan as Sofwan
 Nuzuhath Shuaib as Husham's girlfriend
 Ahmed Nashith as Sikey
 Misbah Hameed as Kaatey
 Ali Shunan as Shuntee
 Rizwee as Bond
 Ismail Rasheed as Naeem; Husham's father
 Ahmed Saeed as Husham's uncle
 Mariyam Shakeela as Aiman’s aunt
 Mohamed Waheed as Wahid; Niusha's father
 Ahmed Sunee as Zaina's brother
 Ali Shazleem as Ahmed Qalib; station inspector
 Ismail Jumaih as Hambe
 Ahmed Easa aa Husham’s friend (special appearance)
 Mohamed Rifshan as Husham’s friend (special appearance)
 Huneysa Adam Naseer as Sofwan’s sister (special appearance)

Development
The film was announced on 13 March 2017 as Shinan's second direction after his first successful directorial venture 4426 (2016) alongside Fathimath Nahula. On 29 July 2017, it was reported that Mohamed Jumayyil was cast in the lead role of the crime thriller to be featuring in a role he has never portrayed before alongside Hassan Irfan, a vocalist who has performed in the second season of Maldivian Idol. Filming was commenced on 22 November 2017 alongside a big cast including several new faces.

Soundtrack

Release and response
The film was initially planned to release the film on 5 April 2018 though they pushed the release date to year's end since their prime focus during the time was aligned to marketing of Vakin Loabin (2018). However, the release date was later confirmed to be 4 February 2019 citing "political instability" during late 2018.

Goh Raalhu received mixed reviews from critics. Aminath Luba of Sun called the film a "five-star worthy blockbuster" and praised every department of it including the cinematography, visual effects, and the plot twist at the end. Terming the crime thriller a "revelation", Luba noted the performances of the actors to be "praise worthy" considering most of the performers are "fresh on-screen".

Ifraz Ali from Dho?! criticized that the movie could not keep up to the hype and it was a mere disappointment. Weak storytelling, issues with character development and "cringe" dialogues was his main concerns. However, he praised Dark Rain for casting a full fresh-face cast and trying out a risky genre like Thriller in Dhivehi Cinema.

References

2019 films
Maldivian thriller films
Dark Rain Entertainment films
Films directed by Ahmed Sinan

External links